Lilienfeld is a city in Lower Austria (Niederösterreich), Austria, south of St. Pölten, noted as the site of Lilienfeld Abbey. It is also the site of a regional hospital Landesklinikum Voralpen Lilienfeld.
The city is located in the valley of the Traisen River. Lilienfeld is in the province which the Ancient Romans called Noricum. On March 19, 1905, Muckenkogel was the site of the first official Alpine Ski Race, which was won by ski pioneer, Czech-born Mathias Zdarsky.

Population

Twin cities
  Třebíč
  Jōetsu

References

Cities and towns in Lilienfeld District